The Merry Widow is a 1952 American film adaptation of the 1905 operetta of the same name by Franz Lehár. It starred Lana Turner (whose singing voice was dubbed by Trudy Erwin) and Fernando Lamas.

The film received two Oscar nominations: for Best Art Direction - Set Decoration, Color (Cedric Gibbons, Paul Groesse, Edwin B. Willis, Arthur Krams) and Best Costume Design, Color. Paul Francis Webster provided revised lyrics for a greatly abridged score of the operetta conducted by Jay Blackton.

Plot
At a New Year's Eve party in 1899, the King of Marshovia, a small European country with financial difficulty, dispatches Marshovia's ambassador to the United States to invite a young, rich widow, Crystal Radek, to Marshovia for the unveiling of a statue in honor of her deceased husband, Charlie, a Marshovian native. The king's underlying reason is to access her wealth for the nation's coffers; and, he sends out Count Danilo hoping the count can woo her. Crystal and her secretary, Kitty Riley, arrive without anyone receiving them; but, they see Count Danilo singing and dancing with the townspeople.  Crystal and Kitty report to the palace. The king directs the count sing as Crystal stands in the balcony window of her bedroom, and she is impressed. The count, a ladies' man, is not interested in settling down; but, the king orders otherwise. Count Danilo calls on Crystal, but leaves after thinking Kitty is Crystal. Crystal discovers she was invited because of her wealth, and begins packing for her return to America. However, she remains attracted to Danilo.  Because of Danilo's mistake, the two ladies allow Kitty to assume Crystal's identity as the widow Radek. Crystal attends a party where she meets Danilo who is immediately attracted to her. Crystal says her name is "Fifi" and feigns ignorance of who he is. They go to his upstairs living quarters but Crystal angrily chides Danilo for his lecherous manner and walks out. She then returns, apologizes, and they profess their love for each other. Crystal leaves without Danilo knowing where "Fifi" lives. As Danilo searches for "Fifi," Crystal wants to be sure Danilo loves her for herself and not for her wealth.  Danilo finds her, but because of his orders from the king to woo the widow, he refuses to commit himself to "Fifi."  Crystal reveals her true identity to the count, but because of their mutual deception toward each other, the couple separates.  The king says "heads will roll" because of this. Crystal, however, pays off the nation's debt and intends to leave.  No longer forced to woo Crystal, Danilo still professes his love for her and the couple reunites.

Cast
 Lana Turner as Crystal Radek
 Fernando Lamas as Count Danilo
 Una Merkel as Kitty Riley. Merkel played Queen Dolores in the 1934 film version.
 Richard Haydn as Baron Popoff
 Thomas Gomez as the King of Marshovia
 John Abbott as the Marshovian ambassador
 Marcel Dalio as the police sergeant
 King Donovan as Nitki
 Robert Coote as Marquis de Crillon
 Lisa Ferraday as Marcella
 Joi Lansing as a Maxim's girl (uncredited)
 Lisa Golm as Queen (uncredited)
Gwen Verdon and Matt Mattox performed specialty dances choreographed by Jack Cole.

Reception
According to MGM records, the film made $2,232,000 in the US and Canada and $2,268,000 overseas resulting in a profit of $27,000.

References

External links
 
 
 
 

1952 films
1950s romantic musical films
American romantic musical films
Films directed by Curtis Bernhardt
Metro-Goldwyn-Mayer films
Films set in Europe
Films set in the 1900s
Operetta films
Films based on operettas
Films produced by Joe Pasternak
Films with screenplays by William Ludwig
Films with screenplays by Sonya Levien
1950s English-language films
1950s American films